Michael John Crandon (born 10 December 1953) is an Australian politician.  He was first elected for the seat of Coomera to the Legislative Assembly of Queensland for the Liberal National Party of Queensland at the 2009 Queensland Election.

References

|-

1953 births
Living people
Liberal National Party of Queensland politicians
Members of the Queensland Legislative Assembly
English emigrants to Australia
People from the Gold Coast, Queensland
21st-century Australian politicians